The Danongdafu Forest Park is a forest in Guangfu Township, Hualien County, Taiwan.

History
In 2002, the Forestry Bureau started to re-purpose agricultural land in the area to become forests. Trees were planted and the area became a recreational park in 2010.

Geology
The forest is a flatland forest type and is located along the Huadong Valley. It spans over an area of 12.5 km2. It consists of over a million trees with almost 20 different types commonly found at low altitude. It consists of various outdoor sculptures and statues depicting the culture of Taiwanese indigenous peoples.

Events
The forest is the venue for the Hualien Hot Air Balloon Festival.

Transportation
The forest is accessible northeast of Dafu Station of Taiwan Railways.

See also
 List of parks in Taiwan

References

2010 establishments in Taiwan
Forest parks in Taiwan
Landforms of Hualien County
Parks established in 2010
Tourist attractions in Hualien County